The Huaraz Rebellion was an insurrection started in 1885 by indigenous peasants against the Peruvian Republic. The cause for the conflict was the reestablishment of the indigenous tribute by the government of President Miguel Iglesias.

References

Bibliography
 

Wars involving Peru
19th-century rebellions